Prathipati Pulla Rao formerly worked as Civil Supplies Minister of Andhra Pradesh state and  before that as TDP Guntur District president.

The Telugu Desam Party of which he was the leader, is a political party which is active in the state of Andhra Pradesh in the year 2014. He was the minister for Agriculture, Agri-Processing, Marketing and warehousing, Animal Husbandry, Dairy Development, and Fisheries as leader of the Telugu Desam party.

Personal life 
He lives in the Chilakaluripet, Guntur District of the state of Andhra Pradesh. Prathipati Pulla Rao's (59yrs) father's name is Shri Kavuri Subba Rao.  Pulla Rao married Smt. P. V. Kumari who is a housewife. He has two children Swathi and Sarath Babu.

Education 
His highest educational qualification is B.Com. He pursued his B.Com. Pass from VRS and YRN College, Chirala (Andhra University) in the years 1978 to 1981. He did his intermediate studies from T.J.P.S. College, Guntur in the year 1977. By profession, he is a businessman; he is the director of various companies.

Leadership 
Pulla Rao has always placed an emphasis on supporting farmers. In 2015, Prathipati Pulla Rao took part in the Telugu Desam Party's JanaChaitanya Yatra in Gudivada town of Krishna district. In that year a total of 2,60,000 hectares of paddy crops were lost in the state due to heavy rains. Nearly 6,000 hectares of fish and prawn cultures were damaged due to rains, therefore he asked the union government to sanction a large amount to Andhra Pradesh and help the farmers.

References

Andhra University alumni
Telugu Desam Party politicians
Living people
State cabinet ministers of Andhra Pradesh
People from Guntur district
Year of birth missing (living people)